Salango Island is a South American island of approximately one square kilometer located in the Pacific Ocean one kilometer off the coast of the province Manabí in Ecuador near the town of Salango.

The island is part of the Machalilla National Park and is home to species such as the blue-footed booby (Sula nebouxii), while in the waters of the island, it is occasionally possible to observe whales.
In the surroundings of Salango Island it is possible to observe blue-footed booby, sea lions and large rocks that, due to their peculiar shapes, the work of nature, receive the names of the King Kong monkey and the giant turtle

See also 
 Geography of Ecuador

Referencias

External links 
 Island photo Wikimedia commons
 Island photoWikimedia commons
 Island map in Wikimapia

Islands of Ecuador